Mt. Vernon station (formerly Centre Street station) is a Baltimore Light Rail station in the Mount Vernon neighborhood of Baltimore, Maryland.

References

External links
Station from Centre Street from Google Maps Street View
 Monument Street entrance from Google Maps Street View

1992 establishments in Maryland
Baltimore Light Rail stations
Mount Vernon, Baltimore
Railway stations in Baltimore
Railway stations in the United States opened in 1992